Quercus costaricensis is a species of oak native to Central America (Costa Rica, Honduras, and Panama). It is often found with Quercus copeyensis in the upper montane forests, to  elevation. The leaves are tough and leathery with a short petiole and  toothed margin. Wind is the primary pollinator. Squirrels are their main seed predator but also their main disperser as they commonly lose their buried seeds.

References

External links

 IUCN Red List:  Quercus costaricensis
 photo of herbarium specimen at Missouri Botanical Garden, collected in Costa Rica in 1984

costaricensis
Trees of Central America
Flora of Costa Rica
Flora of Honduras
Flora of Panama
Plants described in 1854
Flora of the Talamancan montane forests